
Nettlebed Cave is a limestone cave located in the Mount Arthur region of the northwest South Island of New Zealand. The presence of ongaonga (Urtica ferox), an endemic tree nettle, near the bottom entrance gives the cave its name.

Until April 2010, when the nearby Ellis Basin cave system was found to be deeper, Nettlebed Cave was thought to be the deepest cave system in the southern hemisphere.

In January 2014 a group of cavers established that the Nettlebed Cave was connected to the Stormy Pot Cave.

Exploration
Nettlebed Cave was first explored by cavers in 1969 through the dry overflow passage of a large spring pouring into the Pearse River. By 1973  of passages had been mapped. It was not until 1979 that a flowstone squeeze known as the Hinkle-horn-honking-holes was passed, making further explorations possible. Five successive Christmas expeditions (1979–80 through 1983–84) utilising underground camps at Salvation Hall and Soft Rock Cafe led to the exploration and mapping of a further .

In 1986 another cave (Blizzard Pot) was connected with Nettlebed Cave, providing an upper entrance to the system, and made the overall depth  from the highest point in Blizzard Pot to the deepest point in Nettlebed Cave.

The long-sought-after connection between Nettlebed and Stormy Pot was made from the Nettlebed side on 29 February 2014, at the end of a week-long camp at Soft Rock Cafe. After a kerosene smoke test had previously indicated a likely point of connection, a team of four (Kieran McKay, Bruce Mutton, Gavin Holden and Jonathan Ravens) dug out the rubble from a choked, drafting, rift to reach the bottom of a small muddy shaft. A tight squeeze at the top of this climb was enlarged slightly with a rock hammer to emerge at the bottom of the urinal pitch for the Rover's Return bivvi (a low sandy passage used as a temporary campsite at one of Stormy Pot's further reaches). The team were extremely grateful for the NZSS policy of carrying out all solid human waste. The overall depth of the combined system (from the top entrance, Big Friendly Giant, to the deepest surveyed point in Nettlebed's Midas Chambers) was later confirmed as  when an accurate GPS survey of the entrance locations was undertaken in December 2015.

Pearse Resurgence
The Pearse Resurgence is the source of the Pearse Stream, and is the resurgence point for all caves on Mt Arthur, including all water flowing in Nettlebed Cave (under normal water levels). This has been confirmed by positive dye tests from caves in the Ellis Basin to the south, from Windrift to the west, and from Nettlebed Cave itself.

On 21 March 2007, a team of international cave divers set a New Zealand cave diving record by reaching a depth of 177m (581 feet below ground level) in the Pearse Resurgence.

In 2011, divers reached  depth by placing four decompression habitats along the cave main tunnel but were still unable to trace the source.

In 2016, Richard Harris and Dave Hurst pushed the limits of the main spring with a 13-hour dive to explore the "Second Breakfast" passage to a depth of  before lights began to implode causing them to turn back.

References

Further reading
Pugsley, C. Caves of the Mount Arthur Region Caving International #4, 1979
Atlas – Great Caves of the World Cave Books, 1989
Marcus Thomas and Neil Silverwood. Caves – Exploring New Zealand's Subterranean Wilderness Potton & Burton 2017,

External links
Caving areas in New Zealand

Caves of the Tasman District